Now You're in Hell is the second EP by French death metal band Necrowretch. It was recorded and mixed on the 10th anniversary of Chuck Schuldiners death and released on 10 March 2012 by Detest Records on 7" vinyl format available in black and red.
Tracks from this EP were re-released on the "Bestial Rites" Compilation.

Track listing

Personnel
Necrowretch
 Vlad – Vocals, Guitar
 Amphycion – Bass
 Mörkk – Drums

Miscellaneous staff
 Milovan Novaković – artwork
 Xavier – recording, mixing

References

2011 EPs
Necrowretch EPs